Bushton is a city in Rice County, Kansas, United States.  As of the 2020 census, the population of the city was 203.

History
Bushton was originally called Sorghum, and under the latter name established in the early 1880s. It was renamed Bushton in 1887, after a number of wild bushes growing at the town site. Bushton was incorporated in 1907.

Geography
Bushton is located at  (38.511817, -98.395077).

Demographics

2010 census
As of the census of 2010, there were 279 people, 117 households, and 78 families residing in the city. The racial makeup of the city was 92.5% White, 2.9% African American, 2.5% Native American, 0.4% from other races, and 1.8% from two or more races. Hispanic or Latino of any race were 8.2% of the population.

There were 117 households, of which 23.9% had children under the age of 18 living with them, 53.0% were married couples living together, 8.5% had a female householder with no husband present, 5.1% had a male householder with no wife present, and 33.3% were non-families. 29.1% of all households were made up of individuals, and 8.6% had someone living alone who was 65 years of age or older. The average household size was 2.38 and the average family size was 2.90.

The median age in the city was 42.4 years. 26.9% of residents were under the age of 18; 3.7% were between the ages of 18 and 24; 22.6% were from 25 to 44; 28.7% were from 45 to 64; and 18.3% were 65 years of age or older. The gender makeup of the city was 51.3% male and 48.7% female.

2000 census
As of the census of 2000, there were 314 people, 134 households, and 95 families residing in the city. The racial makeup of the city was 96.82% White, 1.59% from other races, and 1.59% from two or more races. Hispanic or Latino of any race were 2.87% of the population.

There were 134 households, out of which 26.9% had children under the age of 18 living with them, 60.4% were married couples living together, 7.5% had a female householder with no husband present, and 29.1% were non-families. 26.9% of all households were made up of individuals, and 14.9% had someone living alone who was 65 years of age or older.  The average household size was 2.34 and the average family size was 2.80.

In the city, the population was spread out, with 23.9% under the age of 18, 7.0% from 18 to 24, 23.6% from 25 to 44, 25.5% from 45 to 64, and 20.1% who were 65 years of age or older.  The median age was 42 years. For every 100 females, there were 79.4 males.  For every 100 females age 18 and over, there were 88.2 males.

The median income for a household in the city was $37,250, and the median income for a family was $47,708. Males had a median income of $32,500 versus $18,000 for females. The per capita income for the city was $17,125.  About 6.3% of families and 9.5% of the population were below the poverty line, including 14.5% of those under age 18 and 7.8% of those age 65 or over.

Education
The community is served by Central Plains USD 112 public school district.  Central Plains Middle School was located in Bushton, but closed in 2019.

School unification consolidated Bushton schools into Quivira Heights schools in the 1980s. The Quivira Heights High School mascot was Thunderbirds. Quivira Heights High School closed in 2012.

Bushton High School was closed through school unification. The Bushton High School mascot was Trojans.

Sports
The Central Plains Oilers won the Kansas State High School 8-Man DI football championship in 2014.

The Quivira Heights Thunderbirds won the Kansas State High School 8-Man DII football and 1A boys basketball championships in 1983.

References

Further reading

External links

 Bushton - Directory of Public Officials
 Bushton city map, KDOT

Cities in Kansas
Cities in Rice County, Kansas